El Pedregal Airstrip is a private dirt airstrip located South West of San Quintín, Municipality of Ensenada, Baja California, Mexico, just on the headland of the San Quintín Bay. The airstrip is used solely for general aviation  purposes.

External links
Baja Bush Pilots forum about San Quintín airstrips

Airports in Baja California